Krasnoznamensk is a closed town in Moscow Oblast, Russia. Population:    It was previously known as Golitsyno-2 (until 1994).

History
It was granted town status in 1981. It was known until 1994 as Golitsyno-2.

Administrative and municipal status
Within the framework of administrative divisions, it is incorporated as the closed administrative-territorial formation of Krasnoznamensk—an administrative unit with the status equal to that of the districts. As a municipal division, the closed administrative-territorial formation of Krasnoznamensk is incorporated as Krasnoznamensk Urban Okrug.

Military
The town hosts a reserve mission control center and a primary mission control center for military satellites, the Titov Main Test and Space Systems Control Center (compare the United States' Joint Functional Component Command for Space and Global Strike), which is reflected in its coat of arms.

Notable residents 

Irina Toneva (born 1977), singer

References

Notes

Sources

Cities and towns in Moscow Oblast
Closed cities
Naukograds
Renamed localities of Moscow Oblast